Thomas Mayer (born 3 January 1954) is a German economist who was chief economist of Deutsche Bank from January 2010 to May 2012.

Born in Backnang, Baden-Württemberg, Mayer attended the University of Kiel, earning a doctorate in 1982. Between 1983 and 1990 he worked for the International Monetary Fund, before moving on to the financial sector. After working for Salomon Brothers and Goldman Sachs, he joined Deutsche Bank's London office in 2002. In 2010, he succeeded Norbert Walter as Deutsche Bank's chief economist.

Selected publications

References 

1954 births
Living people
German economists
University of Kiel alumni
Deutsche Bank people